Yelena Plotnikova (born 16 July 1977) is a Kazakhstani archer. She competed in the women's individual event at the 2000 Summer Olympics.

References

1977 births
Living people
Kazakhstani female archers
Olympic archers of Kazakhstan
Archers at the 2000 Summer Olympics
People from Oral, Kazakhstan
Archers at the 1998 Asian Games
Archers at the 2002 Asian Games
Archers at the 2006 Asian Games
Medalists at the 1998 Asian Games
Asian Games medalists in archery
Asian Games bronze medalists for Kazakhstan
21st-century Kazakhstani women